FC Volgodonsk was a Russian football team from Volgodonsk. It played professionally from 1980 to 1997, including one season in the second-highest Russian First Division in 1992. Before 1995 it was called Atommash Volgodonsk, named after a local nuclear engineering company (Atommash).

External links
  Team history at KLISF

Association football clubs established in 1980
Association football clubs disestablished in 2005
Defunct football clubs in Russia
Sport in Rostov Oblast
1980 establishments in Russia
2005 disestablishments in Russia